Day By Day is the ninth studio album by American singer Yolanda Adams. It was released by Atlantic Records on August 30, 2005 in the United States. The album was nominated for a Dove Award for Urban of the Year at the 37th GMA Dove Awards. It also earned two Grammy Award nominations for Best Gospel Performance and Best Gospel Song, with "Be Blessed" winning the former category.

Track listing

Charts

Weekly charts

Year-end charts

References

External links
 

Yolanda Adams albums
Albums produced by Troy Taylor (record producer)
2005 albums